The Yakovlev AIR-12 was a long-range sport aircraft designed and built in the Soviet Union during the late 1930s.

Design and development
In 1936 Yakovlev designed a long-range sport aircraft, intended to perform record-breaking long-distance flights. Adhering to his established design methods, the AIR-12 had a welded steel tube covered by removable aluminium panels at the nose, plywood skinning back to the wing trailing edge and fabric fabric-covered rear fuselage. The plywood skinned wooden wings had a high aspect ratio and were sharply tapered with leading-edge sweep and straight trailing-edges. Control surfaces and tail unit were built up with D1 (duralumin) and covered with fabric.

Accommodation was provided for pilot and passenger/navigator in two closed cockpits. The pilot sat in the rear cockpit aft of the wing trailing-edges under a small forward-sliding canopy and flip-open side panels. The passenger/navigator's cockpit had a flush glazed roof and was situated over the centre-section.

Power was supplied by the ubiquitous  Shvetsov M-11 5-cylinder air-cooled radial engine, driving a two-bladed wooden fixed pitch propeller. Fuel was carried in a single large tank in the fuselage forward of the front cockpit and an auxiliary tank could also be fitted in the front cockpit.

The AIR-12 was fitted with a retractable tail-wheel undercarriage with the main-wheels retracting inwards, operated by cables, torque shaft and hand crank in the pilots cockpit.

After initial flight testing and Piontovskiy's long distance flight in September 1936, the AIR-12 was re-engined with a  M-11Ye.

Operational history
Flight testing of the AIR-12 commenced in August 1936, including a long-distance non-stop flight, flown by Yulian I. Piontkovskiy on 21 September 1936, from Moscow to Kharkiv to Sevastopol, returning to Kharkiv, in a time of 10 hours 45 minutes, covering . On 24 October 1937 the AIR-12, flown by Valentina Grizodoobova (pilot) and Marina Roskova (navigator), flew  from Moscow to Akhtoobinsk but the flight was not recognised by the FAI due to no official observer being present.

Specifications (AIR-12, M-11)

References

1930s Soviet sport aircraft
AIR-12
Single-engined tractor aircraft
Low-wing aircraft
Aircraft first flown in 1936